= Sam Scoccia =

Profile
- Position: Defensive tackle Guard

Personal information
- Born: July 27, 1928; Buffalo, New York, U.S.
- Died: May 12, 1996 (aged 65); Hamilton, Ontario, Canada
- Listed height: 5 ft 11 in (1.80 m)
- Listed weight: 240 lb (109 kg)

Career history
- 1950, 1951: Hamilton Tiger-Cats
- 1952–1954: Saskatchewan Roughriders
- 1954–1965: Ottawa Rough Riders

Awards and highlights
- Grey Cup champion (1960)

Sam Scoccia (1928 – May 12, 1996) was a Canadian Football League defensive lineman who played 14 seasons in the CFL, mainly for the Ottawa Rough Riders, and was a member of their 1960 Grey Cup winning team. He played his first season for the Hamilton Tiger Cats in 1951, then the Saskatchewan Roughriders for 3 years, and ended his career with Ottawa. From 1952 to 1965, Scoccia played no fewer than 12 games, missing only 2 games from 1956 to 1965. He intercepted 2 passes in his career, in 1960 and 1961.
